Film+ is a Hungarian television channel, owned by RTL Group. The channel broadcasts 24 hours a day, and features exclusively movies. Its channel voice is Péter Tarján.

The channel's advertising time is sold by R-Time.

History 

The channel was launched on September 15, 2003 as F+. Later, on September 4, 2004, the channel received its current name, while M+ and Humor 1 merged under the name Cool. Since then, it has been one of the most watched cable TV channels along with Cool. It is available in more than 2.5 million households.

Its sister channel was Film+2, which launched on April 2, 2008. It was originally made for women, with comedies, drama and romantic films, and later began to broadcast cult films. Film+2 changed its name into RTL Gold on July 3, 2017, with its schedule being completely changed.

From September 15, 2007, along with Cool, it used the Romanian rating system.

The first major change of logo and image was on September 15, 2008. Between 2009 and 2010, realistic image elements were introduced, with its logo.

On May 27, 2011, the former owner, IKO, announced another change of image. The announcement: “Film+ and Film+2 complete the IKO cable group’s film channel portfolio and to make this unit even clearer to our viewers, on Friday, May 27, 2011, from 21:05 CET, we will introduce the new screen ident, which is also competitive with the international movie channels. Thus, even in its appearance, a modern and energetic channel pair will provide a choice for viewers who want masculine or feminine-family content.”

On December 18, 2012, along with Cool and Film+2, it switched to wide-screen.

On December 1, 2014, at 08:57 CET, it received its current logo and idents, and also launched its HD version, only for tests. Its idents were designed by Play Dead. From January 1, 2015, its headquarters became Luxembourg, and the HD version was officially launched. Since March 2015, despite the new headquarters, RTL's cable channels use the Hungarian rating system.

External links
 

Television in Hungary
RTL Group
Television networks in Hungary
Television channels and stations established in 2003
2003 establishments in Hungary
Mass media in Budapest